Under New Zealand law, a licensing trust is a community-owned company with a government-authorised monopoly on the development of premises licensed for the sale of alcoholic beverages and associated accommodation in an area. This applies to both on-licence and off-licence sales.

The Invercargill Licensing Trust (ILT) in 1944 was the first such body, and remains the highest profile example. Most other trusts have been small by comparison, but several have now created a jointly-owned management company, Trust House Limited, and the assets and payouts of this are very similar to that of the ILT.

The uniqueness of licensing trusts revolves around:

 A responsibility to enhance the well-being of their defined community;
 The distribution of (surplus) profits back to their communities;
 The provision of good, ‘model’ facilities for the sale of alcohol, the provision of accommodation and meals, and gaming;
 Accountability to the communities who own them.

In addition, there is an inherent responsibility to efficiently operate commercial businesses profitably.

Licensing trusts belong to the family of community enterprises that are part of the third sector, a hybrid form of organisation that crosses over sectors, a mixture of market orientation and solidarity (community support). They may be defined as businesses whose primary goals are to support the well-being of their community principally through reinvesting profits generated from their trading activities either in the business and/or in support of community activities, rather than being driven to maximise profits.

The only "essential" liquor outlets allowed to stay open during the COVID-19 pandemic were the ones in "Trust" areas where they had a monopoly on liquor sales and local supermarkets could not sell beer or wine.

History

Context
In the early history of New Zealand, living conditions were often difficult, and hard drinking and the often consequential drunkenness can be seen as a reaction to the times. Abuses, which were common during the nineteenth century, inevitably brought increasing restrictions through legislation.

These abuses gave rise in the late 1800s to the temperance and prohibition movements.

In 1893, the Alcoholic Liquors Sale Control Act aligned licensing districts with parliamentary electorates. Licensing polls were to be held with each general election. There were now three options to choose from. These were "continuance of the status quo", reduction of the number of liquor licences by 25 percent, and "local no-licence" which would prevent public sale of alcohol within that electorate. Continuance and reduction only needed a majority, but local no licence needed three-fifths majority.

What resulted was that a number of areas voted for a prohibition on alcohol sales. Clutha was the first in 1894, Ashburton and Mataura followed in 1902, Invercargill, Oamaru, and Grey Lynn in 1905, and Bruce, Wellington South, Wellington suburbs, Masterton, Ohinemuri and Eden in 1908. 1911 saw the peak of the prohibition movement when it failed by only 20,000 votes to carry national prohibition. Thereafter the strength of the prohibition movement faded. But it was 1999 before the last "dry" areas disappeared.

Emergence of licensing trusts
On 25 September 1943 the voters of Invercargill, by 8,015 votes to 6,342, restored the sale of liquor within the borough. Prohibition had existed for 38 years and the voting, on the face of it, was apparently a clear indication there was a mood for change. But controversy immediately arose. The 60% threshold necessary to achieve change had only been achieved with the overwhelming support (81.5%) of the soldiers’ votes overseas. The ‘domestic’ vote had been similar to the previous triennial polls at 56.8%. There were suggestions that the voting papers of the soldiers should be returned to New Zealand and recounted. But it was found they had been destroyed in the Middle East. While a good deal of inferences were thrown about, and the Prime Minister, Peter Fraser, offered explanations and a report to Parliament, there was no evidence that what had occurred in destroying the papers was anything other than a misunderstanding. Given the circumstances of the soldiers, it was entirely reasonable that they would give overwhelming support.

In Invercargill there was a mood of enthusiasm to start anew, but there were also considerable concerns. In the end because the community could not make up its mind, the Government decided. On 27 March 1944 the Government announced that they intended to pursue legislation that would set up a trust that would be "...a body corporate, for the purpose of providing for the establishment of model hotels in the Invercargill licensing district …in the interests of the public well-being, and of providing for the sale of intoxicating liquor in the district and to provide for the distribution of the profits for public purposes."

The New Zealand parliamentary debates during the introduction of the first licensing trust legislation suggest the New Zealand legislation was based on the British "Carlisle Scheme" that had been established during the First World War on the Scottish border, but there were also significant differences.. H G R Mason was Minister of Justice from 1935 to 1949 (and again from 1957 to 1960) and responsible for the licensing legislation. He shepherded the licensing trusts acts through Parliament, and was strongly committed to the concept of licensing trust.

The Invercargill Licensing Trust Act 1944 came into force on 17 April 1944. The Masterton Licensing Trust Act followed in December 1947,
 and the Licensing Amendment Act (with provision for a further poll on trust control)  in 1949.

Trusts established and demised
30 licensing trusts were established, and 18 remained active as of 2017:

While not all licensing trusts have survived, the 19 that continue to actively trade and be involved in their communities held assets in 2008 of NZ$313 million, generated revenue of $357m, profits of $42m, and donated support to their community of $33m. The collective results of the trusts were presented to the Law Commission in October 2009 as part of a submission, and showed that licensing trusts operate 133 licensed premises which include hotels totalling 890 accommodation units, and such diverse activities as supermarkets, a housing estate, a hydro-electric power scheme, and property portfolios.

Poor management and governance have been identified as the main reasons for the demise of many of the 12 now dissolved licensing trusts.

Elections and accountability
The functions of a Licensing Trust are specified in Section 305 of the "Sale and Supply of Alcohol Act" of 2012.

Trustees for each licensing trust are elected by the community every three years at the triennial local government elections. Generally six trustees are elected, but some trusts with a ward system may have up to nine. The elective nature of governance provides accountability and a direct link to the community. However, elections for the position of trustee are often poorly contested.

Areas do not automatically vote on whether to keep trusts, if they have them, or to establish them if they do not. However, if the trust's board so resolve, or 15% of the electors in a trust area petition for it, a referendum will be held on whether to continue the trust. If 50% of electors vote to abolish it, the trust is disestablished and liquor sales revert to the rules that apply to most of the country.

The same process allows new licensing trusts to be created upon the petition of 15% of the electors in an area, and this would happen without any further referendum or input from the remaining 85% of electors. However, no new trusts have been established since the liberalisation of liquor laws in 1989.

Lincensing trusts are considered by the Office of the Auditor-General to be "probably the least scrutinised part of the public sector". 

As they are not listed with the Companies Office, the accounts of lincensing trusts are not able to be easily scrutinised by the public, and they have often been late in filing their accounts with the Auditor-General. 

Further, as no central government agency, select committee or local authority has responsibility for monitoring them, there is no government department to which the public can raise complaints when they have issues with the trusts. The only means through which the public can oversee the trusts is by making a request under the Local Government Official Information and Meetings Act 1987.

Trustees
Birkenhead Licensing Trust (2022-2025)

Cheviot Licensing Trust (2022-2025)

Clutha Licensing Trust (2022-2025)

Flaxmere Licensing Trust (2022-2025)

Geraldine Licensing Trust (2022–2025)

Invercargill Licensing Trust (2022–2025)

Mataura Licensing Trust (2022–2025)

Mount Wellington Licensing Trust (2022–2025)

Oamaru Licensing Trust (2022–2025)

Portage Licensing Trust (2022–2025)

Rimutaka Licensing Trust (2022–2025)

Te Kauwhata Licensing Trust (2022–2025)

Waitākere Licensing Trust (2022–2025)

Wiri Licensing Trust (2022–2025)

Community support donations
The original licensing trust legislation provided an enabling clause to donate moneys back to their communities in support of the promotion, advancement, or encouragement of education, science, literature, art, physical welfare, and any other cultural and recreational purposes;...(and) any other philanthropic purposes. Their annual reports example a very wide range of recipients across the broad spectrum of community life. The elected nature of trusts delivers trustees representative of the community with a wide knowledge of its needs. Each trust board decides what community organisations and events shall be supported, and donations are many and varied as exampled.

Masterton Licensing Trust
In 1968, the then Mayor of Masterton advocated to the Masterton Licensing Trust that the wasteland on the edge of the town, bordered by two rivers, be converted into a recreational lake and parklands. Over the years since, the Trust has supported the Henley Lake scheme with many donations totalling hundreds of thousand dollars so that today, a lake of 14 hectares, parklands with walking and running tracks, wildlife reserves, and public facilities (for example, a Men's Shed) support activities generating many hundreds of visitors daily.

In the past ten years, Trust House, the trading arm of the Masterton Licensing Trust and other trusts, has distributed $31.150 million to its communities; with the 2016 charitable distribution being $3,483,000.

Mataura Licensing Trust
For 56 years, the Mataura Licensing Trust has been investing in its community, returning profits to its customers and creating jobs. It has been instrumental in future-proofing sporting amenities, as well as supporting the arts, education and destination events, all of which directly or indirectly bolster the local economy. Gore's multi-sports complex is the flagship of its endeavours – a venue featuring the latest water-turf technology for hockey, a four-court event centre, a short-course Olympic ice skating rink and a two-pool aquatic centre established in partnership with local Government and sports groups. The complex has hosted national tournaments and events, such as the Young Farmer of the Year.

Invercargill Licensing Trust
Several years ago, the Invercargill Licensing Trust, working with all Invercargill school principals, established a goal to pursue initiatives that would lead to Invercargill schools being recognised as leaders in education in New Zealand. A number have since been implemented, supported by Trust funding.

Portage and Waitākere Licensing Trusts

The Portage Licensing Trust and Waitākere Licensing Trust, operating jointly as The Trusts, have a near monopoly on liquor sales in West Auckland. In 2013, they were generating a combined $100 million a year in sales and employing 400 people. The Trusts Stadium is one of their most significant investments.

Ashburton Trust Event Centre

When the Ashburton community recognised the need for an all encompassing performing arts centre, the Licensing Trust supported the project, and over the years has contributed $1.6 million to feasibility studies, planning, development and establishment.

The events centre receives around 45,000 visitors annually through shows, conferences and award ceremonies, many from outside the district, thus enhancing economic growth as well as cultural diversity.

Rimutaka Licensing Trust
In 2002, this small Trust which operates a one Tavern outlet on the fringe of Upper Hutt City, took responsibility to build a sound shell stage in Harcourt Park. The $281,250 stage was then given to the city and the people of Upper Hutt. Rimutaka schools have also benefited from major donations over the past decade.

In the 10 years between 2001 and 2010, the Trust has supported its community with donations of $4.6 million.

Flaxmere Licensing Trust
Founded in 1975, the Flaxmere Licensing Trust was the last of the licensing trusts to be established; over the years it has supported its low income community with wide-ranging grants to education in the village of Flaxmere. During the last 20 years, the Trust has given $4.7 million to the Flaxmere community.

Mt Wellington Charitable Trust
Mt Wellington Charitable Trust was formed in 1964.  The Trust focuses on assisting a wide variety of charitable, educational, cultural and sporting organisations located in the local areas of Mt Wellington, Panmure, Glen Innes, Ellerslie and Otahuhu.  The average annual allocation of donations exceeds $1 million per annum.

The first major project the Trust embarked upon was the establishment of Swimarama, the local swimming pool complex in 1968.

More recent major projects involve provision of technical equipment to lower decile schools in the area; establishment at Bill McKinley Park of artificial turf for soccer and other community sporting activities, and assistance in developing the Auckland Netball Courts over the past five years which is now one of the largest sporting facilities in Auckland.

Notes

References

Teahan, Bernard (2018) Licensing Trusts in "Policy Quarterly" February 2018, Vol 14 No 1 pages 68–73
Teahan, Bernard (2009) Alcohol in Our Lives Issues Paper. Submitted to the New Zealand Law Commission.
Teahan, Bernard (2007) Community Enterprises: Enduring Institutions for a Newer World. Doctoral Thesis, Victoria University of Wellington.
Teahan, Bernard (1990) Licensing Trusts in New Zealand: A Unique Social Mandate. Masters Thesis, Massey University of Palmerston North.
Lind, Clive (1994) Pubs, Pints and People: 50 years of the Invercargill Licensing Trust. Invercargill Licensing Trust.
Masterton Licensing Trust (1997). A Matter of Trust: Masterton Licensing Trust 1947 – 1997. Masterton Licensing Trust.
Seabury, Olive (2007) The Carlisle State Management Scheme. Bookcase.
Round, Derek (2001) Henry Greathead Rex Mason KC CMG: An Outstanding Law Reformer. Waikato Law Review.
Birdsall, Nancy and John Nellis (2002) Winners and Losers: Assessing the distributional impact of privatization. Center for Global Development, working paper number 6.
Megginson, William L. and Jeffrey M. Netter (2001) From State to Market: A Survey of Empirical Studies on Privatization. Journal of Economic Literature, vol. 39, no.2.

External links
Birkenhead Licensing Trust
Clutha Licensing Trust
Invercargill Licensing Trust
Mataura Licensing Trust
Mount Wellington Licensing Trust
Oamaru Licensing Trust
The Trusts, combined site for both Portage Licensing Trust and Waitākere Licensing Trust 
Wiri Licensing Trust

Alcohol law in New Zealand
Alcohol in New Zealand
Community organizations